The Salad Way is the third studio album by English band Salad, released in August 2019 by 3 Bean Records. It is the band's first album of new material in 21 years since Ice Cream (1997).

Donald Ross Skinner, the producer behind the band's previous album, became their drummer after working with Marijne van der Vlugt and Paul Kennedy under "Salad Undressed" since 2016. They were also joined by Charley Stone, former guitarist of Gay Dad.

Track listing

Personnel 
Salad
 Marijne van der Vlugt – vocals, guitar, harmonium, percussion, piano
 Paul Kennedy – guitar, vocals, piano
 Pete Brown – bass
 Charley Stone – guitar, vocals
 Donald Ross Skinner – drums, percussion, keyboards

Production
 Gordon Mills Jr. – producer, mixing
 Jon Clayton – engineer
 Tim Topple - photography

References

External links 

The Salad Way at YouTube (streamed copy where licensed)
Facebook - SaladBand

Salad (band) albums
2019 albums